Hagnagora luteoradiata is a species of moth of the family Geometridae first described by Paul Thierry-Mieg in 1892. It is found from Costa Rica to Ecuador.

The most prominent difference from related species is the absence of the yellow blotches on the hindwings that are present in both Hagnagora ephestris and Hagnagora discordata. The transversal yellow band on the forewing is broader than in H. discordata and has a different shape than in H. ephestris.

Gallery

References

Moths described in 1927
Larentiinae